Palorinya Refugee Settlement is a refugee camp in Moyo District in North Western, West Nile region of Uganda.

Background 
Palorinya Refugee Settlement was established in  December 2016 to host refugees from South Sudan. This refugee camp was opened to relax the suppressing number of new arrivals at the Bidibidi refugee settlement to add up to the number and secure a new place for the incoming population. 25,212 South Sudanese refugees were received at Palorinya refugee camp, Moyo district by 30 December 2016. 8,532 South Sudanese refugees arrived in Uganda by 15 December, 2016. Palorinya in the Moyo district, is expected to host up to 100,000 refugees. But two months after inception, its already home to more than 42,000 refugees from the country of origin of South Sudan.

Geography 
The settlement currently hosts approximately 166,000 South Sudanese refugees with a total surface area of 37.58 square kilometres and is closed to new arrivals since the available number is under supervision and control by the implementing agents and organizations.

Health and sanitation

Social services 

Unemployment solutions for refugees in Bidibidi, Palorinya refugee settlements, and surrounding host communities in which the young people are trained on basic and lifelong vocational skills is being implemented by UNHCR in order to support the young generation and those at their age of retirement.

Education

Water and services

References

Refugee camps in Uganda
Moyo District
South Sudan–Uganda relations
2016 establishments in Uganda